Madeline-Ann Aksich,  (1956 – September 25, 2005) was a Canadian businesswoman, philanthropist, artist and founder of the International Children's Institute. On May 1, 2001 she was appointed to the Order of Canada for her humanitarian work. After her death, she was remembered in the House of Commons by MP Francis Scarpaleggia. The Madeline-Ann Aksich Visual Arts Studio at Marianopolis College is named in her honour.

References

1956 births
2005 deaths
Businesspeople from Montreal
20th-century Canadian philanthropists
Canadian women in business
Members of the Order of Canada
Deaths from uterine cancer
Canadian people of Croatian descent
People from Beaconsfield, Quebec
Canadian women philanthropists
21st-century Canadian philanthropists
20th-century women philanthropists